Atla alpina is a species of saxicolous (rock-dwelling), crustose lichen in the family Verrucariaceae, and the type species of the genus Atla. Found in Europe, it was formally described as a new species in 2008 by Sanja Savić and Leif Tibell.

References

Verrucariales
Lichen species
Lichens described in 2008
Lichens of Central Europe
Lichens of Eastern Europe
Lichens of Northern Europe